Green Hills Academy is a secondary school situated in the Kavresthali, Tarkeshwor, Ward No. 2, North side of Kathmandu, Nepal.

Establishment
Green Hills Academy School was established in 2000 A.D. (2057 B.S.). The founder of this school is Mr. Rajeshwar Pd. Yadav. This school was established in one of the rural area of Kathmandu Valley with a view to provide good education to the people of this place.

The School motto reads "Knowledge is the Source of Light".

Educational Objectives
To prepare dedicated, devoted, disciplined and enlightened citizens.
To impart qualities like moral integrity, patriotism, love for national art and culture.
To enable students to lead a productive and happy life in the 21st century.

Chronology
2057 B.S.
2058 B.S.
2060 B.S.

2057 B.S.
It was established as Primary School (Nursery to class 5).

2058 B.S.
It was upgraded to a Lower Secondary School (Nursery to Class 8).

2060 B.S.
It was upgraded to a Secondary School (Nursery to Class 10) in 2060 B.S., and produced the first batch of Students with eight students with cent percent passed result with 4 First and 4 Second Division.

Other facilities
 Computer Classes
 Science Laboratory
 Library
 Tuition Classes
 School Canteen
 School Stationery

Computer classes
This school provides the basic computer knowledge to the students of Class 3 to Class 7.

Science laboratory
This school has science laboratory too. This school provides the Practical knowledge of Science from Class 3 to Class 10 which helps to add extra knowledge to the students as it is the era of science and technology.

Library
The School has medium-sized library with about 3000 titles. The School library is well stocked with reading and learning materials to support your coursework. There is a wide range of books, newspapers and journals, as well as general interest and fiction titles. Study spaces, internet facilities and other electronic resources are also available. Every year new additions are made to the existing collections.

Tuition classes
This school also provides tuition class to weak students.

School Canteen
We have well maintained school canteen. The school canteens  serve varieties of fresh, nutritious and hygienic foods and hot and cold drinks in subsidized rates to its staff and students during school hours.

School Stationery
We also provide stationery facility to the students. We have a stationery shop named GHA Stationery inside school premises which provide education materials like copy, books, pen, pencils and more in adequate price.

Location
The school is situated in Tarkeshwor - '4', Kathmandu in the lap of Shivapuri National Park, about 5.5 km far from Balaju, Bypass.

Schools in Kathmandu
2000 establishments in Nepal